Sawbridge is a hamlet.

Sawbridge may also refer to:
 Samuel Elias Sawbridge, MP for Canterbury
 Janet Sawbridge, skater
 John Sawbridge, MP

See also
 Sawbridgeworth, Hertfordshire, England
 Sawridge, a First Nation in Alberta